Zetna Fuentes is an American television director. She was nominated for three Daytime Emmy Awards for work on the soap opera One Life to Live, as a part of the directing team. She was nominated for Best Director – Television at Imgen Awards in 2022 for This Is Us.

Fuentes is also a theatre director, having directed a number of New York Off-Broadway productions. She was born and raised in the Bronx, New York.

Directing credits
Guiding Light
One Life to Live 
Pretty Little Liars
The Carrie Diaries
Switched at Birth
The Fosters
Grey's Anatomy
Jane the Virgin
iZombie
Forever
How to Get Away with Murder 
Longmire
Pitch
Shameless 
Ray Donovan 
The Chi
Bosch
The Nevers
The Great
Scandal
This Is Us 
Bosch: Legacy 
The Old Man

References

External links

American television directors
American theatre directors
Women theatre directors
American women television directors
Living people
People from the Bronx
Year of birth missing (living people)